Cooma is a town in the Goulburn Valley region of Victoria, Australia.

Cooma's Uniting Church, opened in 1926 as a memorial to those who served in World War I, closed in April 2022.

References

External links

Towns in Victoria (Australia)
City of Greater Shepparton